The Mississippi Insurance Department was created as a separate department by an Act of the Mississippi Legislature, effective March 1, 1902.  The Act provided for the election of an Insurance Commissioner at the general election of 1903 and provided that until the election and qualification of such Insurance Commissioner, the duties of the office should be discharged by the State Auditor of Public Accounts.

Responsibilities 
The Mississippi Commissioner of Insurance administers all state laws pertaining to insurance companies, corporations, and their agents and adjustors active in the state. The commissioner licenses and regulates the manufacture and sale of mobile homes and administers the state fire code.

Commissioners of Insurance, 1903-present

References

State agencies of Mississippi
1902 establishments in Mississippi
Insurance organizations
Government agencies established in 1902
Insurance in the United States